Jungle Fight is a Brazilian mixed martial arts and kickboxing promotion. It was created in 2003. The name is derived from its origin, the Amazonas state in Brazil.

History
Jungle Fight was founded by pioneering MMA fighter and long-time Brazilian Jiu Jitsu black belt, Wallid Ismail.  The organization was created in 2003 and its first event was in Manaus, Amazonas. In 2006 there was an event in Slovenia, the first and so far only, Jungle Fight event held outside of Brazil. No events were held in 2007, but in 2008 it began to hold a series of events in Rio de Janeiro.

Jungle Fight has been described as "easily the best promotion in all of Brazil or South America, for that matter" by Sherdog.com. In Brazil Jungle Fight is broadcast on TV Band, in the United States it is broadcast on ESPN3 and ESPN Deportes. In the Spanish-speaking Latin America, it is broadcast on ESPN.

This MMA organization partnered with Rizin Fighting Federation for the RIZIN FIGHTING WORLD GRAND-PRIX event on December 29-31, 2015. The former Pride FC Heavyweight champion Fedor Emelianenko headlined the NYE Rizin FF main event.

Current champions

Events

References

External links
 List of Events on Sherdog
 Official Website (Brazilian Portuguese)

 
2003 establishments in Brazil
Mixed martial arts organizations
Sports organisations of Brazil
Sports organizations established in 2003
Mixed martial arts in Brazil
Mixed martial arts events lists